Dylin Pillay (born 16 December 1979) is a South African former footballer who is last known to have played as an attacker for Nathi Lions.

Career

Before the 2001 season, Pillay signed for American second division side Seattle Sounders after playing for AmaZulu in the South African Premier Division, before joining South African second division club Nathi Lions.

At the age of 29, he retired due to injury.

References

External links
 Dylin Pillay at IndianFootball.Com

South African soccer players
Living people
AmaZulu F.C. players
1979 births
Seattle Sounders (1994–2008) players
USL First Division players
Manning Rangers F.C. players
South African people of Indian descent
South African Premier Division players
South African expatriate soccer players
South African expatriate sportspeople in the United States
Expatriate soccer players in the United States
South Africa under-20 international soccer players
Association football forwards